Brancepeth is a village and civil parish in County Durham, in England. The population of the civil parish taken at the 2011 census was 414.

Brancepeth Castle was until 1570 the fortress of the Neville Earls of Westmorland. The castle was extensively modified and rebuilt in the 19th century by Viscount Boyne (later Baron Brancepeth). It was later a military hospital.

St Brandon's Church was famed for its exceptional 17th-century woodwork, until it was destroyed in a major fire in 1998; the church has since been restored and reroofed.

In 1924, Harry Colt laid out a golf course on the deer park which formed part of the estate surrounding the castle. A club house was created from the old coach house and stables and remains in use by Brancepeth Castle Golf Club. The 6,400-yard, par 70 course is regarded as one of the finest in the north-east of England.

According to one story, the village's name is said to derive from "Brawn's Path". There is a legend that Brancepeth was once terrorised by an enormous brawn, which was eventually killed by a knight named Sir Roger de Ferie in 1208. A commemorative stone marks the traditional location of the brawn's death.

A more likely explanation is that it derives from "Brandon's Path", after St Brandon, the patron saint of the parish church.

Notable residents
 Arthur Prowse (1907–1981)
 Frederick William Sanderson (1857–1922)

References
Margot Johnson. "Brancepeth" in Durham: Historic and University City and surrounding area. Sixth Edition. Turnstone Ventures. 1992. . Pages 34 to 37.

External links

Villages in County Durham
Civil parishes in County Durham